The 1990 Cleveland Indians season was the 90th season for the franchise.

Offseason
October 4, 1989: Luis Aguayo was released by the Cleveland Indians.
November 21, 1989: Cecilio Guante was signed as a free agent by the Indians.
December 6, 1989: Joe Carter was traded by the Indians to the San Diego Padres for Sandy Alomar Jr., Carlos Baerga and Chris James.
 December 7, 1989: Keith Hernandez was signed as a free agent by the Indians.
 December 8, 1989: Tom Brookens was signed as a free agent by the Cleveland Indians.
January 9, 1990: Scott Bailes was traded by the Cleveland Indians to the California Angels for Colin Charland (minors) and Jeff Manto.
 January 10, 1990: Rafael Santana was signed as a free agent by the Indians.

Regular season

Season standings

Record vs. opponents

Notable transactions
April 25, 1990: Rafael Santana was released by the Indians.
April 30, 1990: Sergio Valdez was selected off waivers by the Indians from the Atlanta Braves.
May 7, 1990: Stan Jefferson was selected off waivers by the Indians from the Baltimore Orioles.
June 17, 1990: Ken Phelps was purchased by the Indians from the Oakland Athletics.
July 11, 1990: Tom Lampkin was traded by the Indians to the San Diego Padres for Alex Cole.
August 12, 1990: Cecilio Guante was released by the Indians.
September 16, 1990: Bud Black was traded by the Indians to the Toronto Blue Jays for Mauro Gozzo and players to be named later. The Blue Jays completed the deal by sending Steve Cummings to the Indians on September 21 and Alex Sanchez to the Indians on September 24.

Draft picks
June 4, 1990: David Bell was drafted by the Indians in the 7th round of the 1990 amateur draft. Player signed June 12, 1990.

Opening Day Lineup

Roster

Statistics

Batting
Note: G = Games played; AB = At bats; R = Runs scored; H = Hits; 2B = Doubles; 3B = Triples; HR = Home runs; RBI = Runs batted in; AVG = Batting average; SB = Stolen bases

Pitching
Note: W = Wins; L = Losses; ERA = Earned run average; G = Games pitched; GS = Games started; SV = Saves; IP = Innings pitched; R = Runs allowed; ER = Earned runs allowed; BB = Walks allowed; K = Strikeouts

Awards and honors
 Sandy Alomar, American League Rookie of the Year, Gold Glove
All-Star Game
 Sandy Alomar, catcher, starter
 Brook Jacoby, third base, reserve
 Doug Jones, relief pitcher, reserve

Farm system

References

1990 Cleveland Indians at Baseball Reference
1990 Cleveland Indians at Baseball Almanac

Cleveland Guardians seasons
Cleveland Indians season
Cleve